Sara Louise Vickers (born 1985) is a Scottish theatre, television and film actress best known for playing Joan Thursday in the British television detective drama series Endeavour.

Early life and education
Vickers was born in 1985, in Strathaven, Scotland, and grew up in Edinburgh. She graduated with a BA from the Royal Academy of Dramatic Art in 2010.

Career

Theatre
In 2010 Vickers appeared in Ibsen's The Lady from the Sea, adapted by David Eldridge and directed by Sarah Frankcom at the Royal Exchange Theatre, Manchester. Playing Dr Wangel's daughter, Bolette, she was reviewed in The Independent as giving a "lively identity" to the role. The British Theatre Guide described her performance as "very good". A review in The Telegraph said she "brim[s] with forceful vitality".

In 2011 she was Maia in Judgement Day, based on Ibsen’s last work When We Dead Awaken, directed James Dacre at the Print Room, Notting Hill Gate, her performance described as "brimming with intelligence and frustrated sexuality". The Evening Standard called her "the lively Sara Vickers". The Guardian'''s Michael Billington gave the production four stars, saying that Vickers "lends Rubek's young wife the spirit of a caged animal".

In November and December 2011 she played Annabella in 'Tis Pity She's a Whore at the West Yorkshire Playhouse. Alfred Hickling in The Guardian, giving the production three stars, wrote that Vickers "makes a plaintive case for Annabella". For her performance she received a Commendation at the Ian Charleson Awards.

In September and October 2013, she appeared as Alexandra McArthur in Dark Road, co-written by Ian Rankin, at the Royal Lyceum in Edinburgh. The Independent called her "a strong Sara Vickers", and The Scotsman, "a fine Sara Vickers".

In 2014 she was Juliet in Romeo and Juliet, directed by Walter Meierjohann, at Victoria Baths, Manchester. Her performance was described as "defiant and energetic, really showing off the youthfulness of Juliet". The Manchester Evening News said she was "occasionally transporting".

Television
Vickers performed the role of Margaret Campbell in the 2012 BBC TV film Bert and Dickie.

Since 2013, she has played the recurring character of Joan Thursday in the Mammoth Screen-produced British television detective drama series Endeavour for ITV, appeared through the 2019 series six, and returned in the 2021 series eight."Filming begins on the sixth series of Endeavour", ITV Press Centre, 25 July 2018. Retrieved 2 January 2019 In 2013 she was Connie Charles in the five episode BBC One drama series Privates.

In 2015, she had a supporting role in Waterloo's Warriors, directed by Ruán Magan, a docudrama produced by Caledonia Television for the BBC. That same year she was the character Lottie in episode one, "Perfect Woman", of series two of Man Down for Channel 4."Man Down - Series 2, Episode 1 - Perfect Woman", British Comedy Guide. Retrieved 2 January 2019

In 2016, she played Cara in one episode of the British sitcom comedy Lovesick, produced by Clerkenwell Films and broadcast on Netflix. She appeared as Leanne Randall in 2016 in the third series of the BBC One crime drama Shetland."Shetland", BBC. Retrieved 2 January 2019 In the Netflix historical drama series The Crown, directed by Benjamin Caron, she performed in one 2016 episode as Crawfie.

In 2018, she appeared as Jane Gooding in one episode of The Alienist, directed by Jakob Verbruggen, for TNT-Netflix.

Beginning with the premiere on 20 October 2019, Vickers appeared as Ms. Crookshanks, a main character in HBO's Watchmen television series continuation of the 1987 DC Comics limited series of the same name.

Vickers appeared in four episodes of the 2021 second series of the Scottish crime drama, Guilt.

Film
Vickers performed as Eilidh in Sunshine on Leith, a 2013 musical film directed by Dexter Fletcher.

She played Lizzie in Breaking'', a 2016 film short directed by Saul Abraham and Joel Feder.

Personal life
Vickers married British actor and RADA classmate Kerr Logan in August 2017. They have a child together.

References

External links
 

1985 births
Living people
Alumni of RADA
Actresses from Edinburgh
People from Strathaven
Scottish stage actresses
Scottish television actresses
Scottish film actresses
21st-century Scottish actresses